Your Hand In Mine (Chinese: 想握你的手) was a long-running TV drama produced by Singapore's free-to-air channel, MediaCorp TV Channel 8. With 180 episodes, it was the longest local drama produced by Mediacorp, until it was succeeded by 118. It aired on weekdays at 7:00 pm. The series' cast included are Huang Wenyong, Chen Liping, Pierre Png, Shaun Chen, Zhang Yaodong, Paige Chua, Joanne Peh, Pan Lingling, Jin Yinji and Cavin Soh.

Your Hand In Mine was the first Mediacorp production to be filmed entirely at outdoor locations like Lentor and Tanjong Katong, and the second to be filmed in high definition after The Ultimatum.

Plot
Penny-pinching Zheng Shan Guo (Huang Wen Yong) and his family of seven live in a five-room apartment. His spendthrift wife Yu Xiang (Chen Li Ping) persuades him to move into a bigger house, but they end up living next to a neurotic neighbour Wu You Li (Cavin Soh). You Li has a large tumor on his neck, making him self-conscious. He is often disagreeable, but the arrival of a blind girl causes him to soften his relations with others.

Lan Jin Yin (Jin Yinji) stays in the apartment next to Shan Guo with her two grandchildren, Li Qin (Shaun Chen) and Li Fen (Paige Chua); their mother Qiu Mei (Jue Xi) has been imprisoned for killing their father. On her release, Qiu Mei is shunned by Jin Yin and Li Qin, but moves into an apartment near them in an attempt to reconcile and make up for her past mistakes. The story touches on family issues, regrets, and love lost and found.

Chit Chat Club
Before an episode, a humorous three-minute clip called Chit Chat Club (叽喳棺) was telecast as an appetizer for viewers.

Cast
 Huang Wenyong as Zheng Shanguo (郑山国) He runs and owns two coffee shops called "899", and is focused on business and profit. He is married to Zheng Yuxiang, who spends his money as soon as he makes it. Despite being henpecked, Shanguo shows his temper whenever Yuxiang spends his savings on a shopping spree. Shanguo hates gambling and avoids donating money because he does not trust the charitable organisations. Despite his tough exterior, he has a soft heart and is willing to help others through actions rather than money. He lives at Lentor Plain with his wife and three daughters, Aizhen, Aishan and Aimei. He longs for a son, but his wife finds ways to avoid getting pregnant.
 Chen Liping as Zhang Yuxiang (张玉香) The female boss of 899 and the unofficial head of the Zheng family. She keeps an iron grip on her husband Shanguo and yearns to climb the social ladder and be a rich 'tai-tai', squandering money on branded bags and clothes. She hates her neighbour, the rag-and-bone man Wu Youli; they often threaten each other with lawsuits and trade insults over seemingly trivial matters. Yuxiang constantly worries about the love life of her three daughters, Aizhen, Aishan and Aimei and tries to find them rich and handsome boyfriends, but always fails in her matchmaking.
 Yvonne Lim as Zheng Aizhen (郑爱真) The eldest daughter of Zheng Shanguo and Zheng Yuxiang. She is nicknamed "Tornado" (龙卷风) because she is impatient and impulsive. She job-hops because her personality makes her unpopular with her employers but she has a long list of admirers. Eventually she gets a job as a television news reporter at Clear Sky channel.
 Belinda Lee as Zheng Aishan (郑爱善) The second daughter of Zheng Shanguo and Zheng Yuxiang. She is a cleanliness freak and a walking dictionary on germs and bacteria; she takes vitamins to 'protect herself from diseases'. She works as an auditor and is disliked by many of her colleagues for her over-scrupulousness.
 Cai Peixuan as Zheng Aimei (郑爱美) The youngest daughter in the family. She has a low IQ and low self-esteem and is often teased for her slowness (慢三拍) and her habit of hiccuping when upset or under pressure. Despite this, she is an expert at baking, often praised by her grandmother. She is very close to her father, who uses her to find out about her mother's spending sprees. After meeting Yue Guang, a psychologist, she finds a job at his clinic to get closer to him, because he listens to her worries.
 Yao Wenlong as Zheng Shuiguo (郑水国) Shanguo's younger brother and Qiaomei's youngest son, Zheng is constantly getting into trouble. He gambles and womanises, worrying his mother. After setting up a sleezy massage parlour, he boasts about being a boss and belittles Qiumei, his tenant, making her pay him in cash for any favours. Despite constantly being bullied by Shuiguo, Shanguo knows his brother well and can see through his underhand behaviours.
 Hong Damu as Lu Qiaomei (卢巧妹) Shanguo and Shuiguo's mother. Jinyin's friend, former neighbour of Li and Wu
 Chen Xijie as Zheng Weiren (鄭偉仁) Shanguo and Yuxiang's son. Li's neighbour
 Shaun Chen as Li Liqin (李立勤) Former CEO of JZ production company. He is Jinyin and Jianzhou's grandson, Lifen's brother and Qiumei. He is married to Aizhen and their child is Xiaolong. In the later part of the series, he goes bad, abusing Aizhen and spying on her and her lover Fang Kai, and violence ensues. He kills Zen in Episode 154 and assaults and kidnaps other characters. 
 Paige Chua as Li Lifen (李立芬) Jinyin and Jianzhou's granddaughter. Liqin's sister. Qiumei's daughter. Zheng's Family neighbor. Aizhen's love rival for Fang Kai. Roland's wife. Film director 
 Jin Yinji as Lan Jinyin (蓝金银) Liqin and Lifen's grandmother. Jianzhou's wife. Qiumei's mother-in-law. Zheng's Family neighbor 
 Jess Teong as Guan Qiumei (关秋梅) Liqin and Lifen's mother. Ex-convict. Dezhu's assistant. Shuiguo's wife. Li Jianzhou & Lan Jinyan's daughter-in-law
 Cavin Soh as Wu Youli (吴有礼) Youqing's brother Aishan's husband. Bai Shouye's & Jinlian's son. Wu Tianming's adopted son. Zheng Shanguo & Zhang Yuxiang's second Son In Law. Zheng's Family neighbor 
 Joanne Peh as Wu Youqing (吴有情) Youli's sister.Yue Guang's Former Fiancee. Bai Shouye's & Jinlian's daughter. Wu Tianming's adopted daughter.Fang Kai's Girlfriend.Zheng's Family neighbor 
 Joanne Peh as Liu Jinlian (刘金莲) Bai Shouye's former wife. Youqing and Youli's mother and a Trickster
 Zhang Yaodong as Yue Guang (岳光) Wu Youqing's former Fiance. Roland's uncle and a Counsellor. Jinlian's friend and died from falling off a building after saving Aizhen
 Adam Chen as Roland Yue Guang's nephew. Lifen's husband. Zen's former boyfriend. H2O's guardian
 Pierre Png as Fang Kai (方楷) Jason and Janet's son and Felicia's brother. Aizhen's former boyfriend. Youqing's boyfriend. Xiaolong's godfather. Chairman of JZ Production Company
 Chen Shucheng as Jason Fang (Jason方) Fang Kai and Felicia's father. Janet's husband. Zen's former admirer
 He Jie as Janet Fang (Janet方) Jason's wife and Fang Kai's mother and Felicia's stepmother
 Sharon Wong as Felicia Fang (Felicia方) Jason and Janet's daughter.Liqin's former girlfriend. she was sent to Reab Centre and overseas by Janet and Jason
 Pan Lingling as Dolly Lin (林多利) Hanwen's wife. Yuxiang's friend. Zen's best friend. Minxing's agent. President of the Women's Club. Xiaodong,Xiaoxi and Xiaonan's mother. Dedao's former girlfriend
 Huang Shinan as Lin Hanwen (林汉文) Duoli's husband. Police officer. Xiaodong,Xiaonan and Xiaoxi's father. Shuixian's former boyfriend
 Chen Xingyu as Lin Xiaonan (林小南) Duoli and Hanwen's son. Xiaoxi's brother. Ah Ru's friend. Child Actor
 Leron Heng as Lin Xiaoxi (林小西) Duoli and Hanwen's daughter. Xiaonan's sister. In relationship with Gao Yongjun
 Joshua Ang as Gao Yongjun (高勇俊) Zen's stepson. Xiaoxi's friend. Shuixian's former student. Vice Chairman of JZ Production Company. Vice Chairman of Zen Production Company
 Lynn Poh as Zen Zhou (Zen周) H2O's stepmother. The Head of JZ Production Company and Head of Zen Production Company. Jason's business partner. Roland's former girlfriend and Duoli's friend
 Pamelyn Chee as Ah Bing (阿冰) Auntie OK's daughter. Aishan, Lifen and Youli's best friend. Aishan's rival in love for Wu Youli
 Celest Chong as Bai Shuixian (白水苋) H2O and Xiaoxi's former form teacher. Shouye's daughter. Hanwen's former girlfriend. Youli and Youqing's half-sister.
 Wang Yuqing as Zhao Dezhu (赵得柱) TCM practitioner. Dedao's brother and Qiumei's admirer
 Wang Yuqing as Zhao Dedao (赵得道) Gynecologist. Dezhu's brother and Duoli's former boyfriend
 Zhang Wei as Bai Shouye (白守业) Bai Shuixian's father. Xiaoke and Shuiguo's boss. Leader of a triad. Youqing and Youli's biological father.

Original sound track

Viewership ratings
The drama did not fare very well in ratings. One of the reasons for this is that the popular Korean drama Cruel Temptation was running in the same slot time on Channel U.

The initial part of the drama attracted an average of 680,000 viewers, the middle part 730,000 and more than 800,000 towards the end. At one time, the ratings plunged to as low as 400,000 viewers, making it Mediacorp's lowest rated long-running drama. Viewers of Your Hand In Mine suggested that Cruel Temptation should be aired on the weekend to fight head-on with Taiwanese drama Love, instead of Glory of Family which was airing during weekends.

Awards & nominations

Star Awards 2010 & 2011

References

External links
Your Hand In Mine Xinmsn page

2009 Singaporean television series debuts
2010 Singaporean television series endings
Singapore Chinese dramas
Channel 8 (Singapore) original programming